Fabiola edithella, or Edith's fabiola moth, is a species of concealer moth in the family Oecophoridae.

The MONA or Hodges number for Fabiola edithella is 1053.

References

Further reading

External links

 

Oecophorinae
Moths described in 1907